The Hanger Lane gyratory is a multi-lane rectangular gyratory – having the Hanger Lane underpass, under its southern limb, for the Western Avenue (A40). It enables intersection with the North Circular (A406) and the inceptive Ealing Road towards Wembley.  It is in the north of the borough of Ealing in west London.

Scope and interior
At rush hour it carries nearly 10,000 vehicles per hour. An above-ground section of the London Underground Central line passes under the structure which takes the form of a rounded-corner rectangular roundabout. The south-east corner of its interior hosts Hanger Lane tube station accessed by paths beneath; the rest hosts small utility buildings and a nature reserve which has many mature, deciduous trees – a Site of Importance for Nature Conservation.

History

The junction became a gyratory in the early 1980s when the western side of the loop was built. In December 2007 it was named Britain's scariest junction.

Before its tunnelling cost was approved, the High Speed 2 railway was to cause a remodelling of the gyratory. but in April 2013 it was decided to put this section of HS2 in a bored tunnel instead due to the cost of rebuilding the gyratory system.

References

External links
Light hearted description of the junction on H2G2
Picture and description

Road junctions in London
Transport in the London Borough of Ealing
Roundabouts in England